PKS 0521-365 is an active galactic nucleus in the constellation Columba. The source (BL Lac object) is a strong emitter from radio to gamma frequencies. The object is at z = 0.055.

BL Lacertae objects
Columba (constellation)